Elemental Masters is a fantasy series  by American writer Mercedes Lackey, taking place on an alternate Earth where magic exists. The series largely focuses on Elemental Masters, people who have magical control over air, water, fire, or earth. Each elemental master has power over elementals, as well. Each book in the series is loosely based on a fairy tale.

Books
 The Fire Rose (1995), based on Beauty and the Beast
 The Serpent's Shadow (2001), based on Snow White
 The Gates of Sleep (2002), based on Sleeping Beauty
 Phoenix And Ashes (2004), based on Cinderella
 The Wizard of London (October 2005), based on The Snow Queen
 Reserved for the Cat (October 2007), based on Puss in Boots
 Unnatural Issue (June 2011), based on Donkeyskin or similar tale
 Home From the Sea (June 2012), based on East of the Sun and West of the Moon, Tam Lin, and The Great Silkie of Sule Skerry
 Steadfast (June 2013), based on the Steadfast Tin Soldier
 Blood Red (June 2014), based on Red Riding Hood
 From a High Tower (June 2015), based on Rapunzel
 A Study in Sable (June 2016), featuring Sherlock Holmes and based on The Twa Sisters
 A Scandal in Battersea (October 2017), featuring Sherlock Holmes and based on the Pied Piper of Hamelin
 The Bartered Brides (October 2018), featuring Sherlock Holmes and based on Bluebeard
 The Case of the Spellbound Child (December 2019), featuring John Watson from Sherlock Holmes and based on Hansel and Gretel
 Jolene (December 2020), based on "Jolene"
 The Silver Bullets of Annie Oakley (January 2022, ISBN 9780756412180)

Baen Books published The Fire Rose before the series was established as such. DAW Books published the remaining titles, inaugurating the "Elemental Masters" moniker and numeration. Hence Serpent's Shadow is the first numbered title in the series.

In addition to the main books, two anthologies (Elemental Magic released in December 2012, and Elementary released in December 2013) have been published, containing works by various fantasy and science fiction authors set in the Elemental Masters universe.

World
The setting of the "Elemental Masters" is an alternative Earth during the early 1900s.  The main and perhaps sole difference between this world and our reality is that magic exists, controlled by those who have mastery over the four classical elements (fire, air, water, earth). The majority of the tales take place in England, with The Fire Rose taking place in North America and focusing on the San Francisco area, while Blood Red and From a High Tower are set in Germany, with a focus on the Black Forest. While history does tend to follow the real-life time line, historic calamities such as the Great Chicago Fire and the earthquake in San Francisco are attributed to the elemental mages that serve as the series namesakes. Also the 1918 flu pandemic is hinted in Phoenix and Ashes due to the machinations of a malevolent Master.

Magic
The world of the "Elemental Masters" is home to two main types of magic: the elemental magic that plays an important part in the series and ESP that is largely explored in The Wizard of London. There have been mentions of different types and degrees of magical ability in the series.

Elemental magic
Elemental magic is the most commonly seen form of magic in the series, with every book having at least a couple of elemental masters as major characters, with one serving as the antagonist. The masters' abilities are tied with their ability to see and control spirits of a particular elemental affinity. Different regions of the world have different Elementals.  Elemental magicians are classed by their affinity (Earth, Air, Fire, and/or Water) and by their mastery of their magic; one can be an Elemental Magician or an Elemental Master. It is mentioned in Blood Red that there is a fifth kind of magic, Spirit, which has no Masters, as the Masters of this element would be able to control the very angels of heaven, and as such no master can be born of this element. This is later proven to not be the case in "A Study In Sable", which features a Master of Spirit who uses a violin to summon spirits and communicate with them.

The Power of Ice and Necromancy
The power of Ice can be seen as a partial exception of the normal abilities of an Elemental mage. Ice can be controlled by a skilled master of Fire, with cold being the inverse of heat. As seen in The Wizard of London, the power of ice is seen as a perversion and innately destructive, as it calls for a basic twisting of a master's nature as well as the world around them.

Similarly, Necromancy, the power of death, in Unnatural Issue is a destructive perversion of the power of Earth.

The Talented
Most of the details given about the talented (those who have some degree of psychic abilities) are seen in The Wizard of London. While the talented in most part fit the descriptions and abilities given psychics in the modern world, there are two main differences. First, certain psychics are able to gain familiars; the second difference is that powerful talents or the talented have psychic Avatars that represent their duties as champions of the light. These avatars tend to draw imagery from fiction and the past.

Sensitives
Details are given in Reserved for the Cat. Sensitives are those who do not have direct magical talents but are able to see and feel to a degree, magic cast by the Elemental Wizards. Some are capable of seeing and sometimes communicating with elemental spirits. Some sensitives may also cast small magics that are often based on emotions. A powerful Sensitive can use their powers to influence people. Sensitives often form the bulk of an Elemental Wizards's household.

Other forms of magic
While psychics, wizards and elemental masters are portrayed as the more common magic users in the western world, the series also focuses on other forms of power such as the Hindu sorcerers of India and the various spirits of the world (such as the fey of England and avatars of the Hindu gods).

Variation on fairy tale models
Each book in the series is loosely based on a famous fairy tale. However, female protagonists in the books are noticeably stronger and more assertive than the fairy tale characters on which they are modeled. The Serpent's Shadow, The Gates of Sleep and Phoenix and Ashes are each based on fairy tales (Snow White, Sleeping Beauty and Cinderella, respectively) in which a girl faces the malevolence of an older and far more powerful woman, before being saved by the intervention of a Prince. In Lackey's novels, the equivalent character does not merely wait passively to be saved, and rather takes an active role in fighting for herself, on equal terms with the male character. Much of this fierce fighting takes place in astral form, when the original fairy tale female was completely passive in deep sleep or coma.

References 

American fantasy novel series
Novels based on fairy tales
Novels by Mercedes Lackey